Bill Dooley was a football coach at the University of North Carolina, Virginia Tech, and Wake Forest University.

Bill Dooley may also refer to:

Bill Dooley (basketball), former head men's basketball coach at the University of Richmond
Billy Dooley (actor), (1893–1938) comedy actor on stage and in over 80 Hollywood films in the 1920s and 30s
Billy Dooley (born 1969), Irish hurler